Veli Karahoda (born 4 January 1968) is an Albanian writer, poet, novelist and essayist. He studied at the University of Pristina, Faculty of Arts.

Published books

Novels
 Kafka's Albanian Castle, 1991, Gjon Buzuku Publishing House, Pristina.
 The Demons, 2000, Rilindja Publishing House, Pristina.
 The Seven Last Words, 2003, Gjon Buzuku Publishing House, Pristina.
 The Serpent and The Shadow, 2015, Gjon Buzuku Publishing House, Pristina.

Novellas / Short stories
 Sirius and Other Stories, 1994, Rilindja Publishing House, Pristina.
 Lucrecia, 1995, Rilindja Publishing House, Pristina.

Poetry
 The Yellow Hourglass, 1992, ArtCenter Publishing Company, Pristina.
 The Academy, 1993, BlendAS Publishing Company, Pristina.

Essays
 The Fair of Corpses (Essays on literature, philosophy, art, aesthetics.), 1992, ArtCenter Publishing Company, Pristina.

References

External links
 Kështjella shqip e Kafkës, roman (a novel): Veli Karahoda: 9788677850029: Amazon.com: Books

1968 births
Living people
Albanian-language writers
Albanian-language poets
People from Prizren
Kosovo Albanians
Yugoslav people of Albanian descent
21st-century Albanian writers
20th-century Albanian poets
21st-century Albanian poets
Albanian male poets
Albanian male writers
Albanian novelists
Albanian male short story writers
Albanian short story writers
Albanian essayists
20th-century novelists
21st-century novelists
Male novelists
20th-century short story writers
21st-century short story writers
20th-century essayists
21st-century essayists
20th-century male writers
21st-century male writers